Cristoforo Pezzini (7 March 1892 – 7 February 1987) was a member of the Italian Christian Democracy, and was an Italian Senator from Lombardy. He did not seek re-election in 1968.

Political career
City councillor of Bergamo and member of the board of directors of Cariplo Foundation, Pezzini obtained four consecutive elections to the Italian Senate, serving from 1948 to 1968.

Personal life
Pezzini was born in Sardinia but he spent his life as a barrister in Lombardy.

Role in the Senate

Committee assignments
Committee on Work and Welfare
Legislature I
Special Committee on Governmental Decrees
Legislature I

Electoral history
1948 election for the Italian Senate
Direct mandate for Bergamo (73.5%) obtaining the landslide victory required by law (more than 2/3 of votes)

See also
Italian Senate election in Lombardy, 1948

Footnotes

External links

Site

1892 births
1987 deaths
Members of the Italian Senate from Lombardy
Christian Democracy (Italy) politicians
20th-century Italian politicians
Members of the Senate of the Republic (Italy)